Caliendrula is a genus of sea snail (marine gastropod mollusks) in the family Clavatulidae. The species Latiaxis elstoni (Barnard, 1962) was recently reclassified as a member of Caliendrula.

Species
 Caliendrula elstoni (Barnard, 1962)

References

External links
 
  Bouchet, P.; Kantor, Y. I.; Sysoev, A.; Puillandre, N. (2011). A new operational classification of the Conoidea. Journal of Molluscan Studies. 77, 273-308